Manuel Luna (27 April 1898 – 9 June 1958) was a Spanish film actor.

Selected filmography
 Nobleza baturra (1935) - Marco
 Carmen, la de Triana (1938) - Antonio Vargas Heredia
 The Song of Aixa (1939)
 Whirlwind (1941) - Segundo Izquierdo
 Follow the Legion (1942)
 Malvaloca (1942)
 We Thieves Are Honourable (1942)
 The Scandal (1943)
 A Shadow at the Window (1944)
 White Mission (1946)
 The Captain's Ship (1947)
 Lola Leaves for the Ports (1947)
 Madness for Love (1948)
 Neutrality (1949)
 The Captain from Loyola (1949)
 Currito of the Cross (1949)
 The Duchess of Benameji (1949)
 Agustina of Aragon (1950)
 Woman to Woman (1950)
 Dawn of America (1951)
 The Lioness of Castille (1951)
 Sister San Sulpicio (1952)
 Lola the Coalgirl (1952)
 Daughter of the Sea (1953)
 The Mayor of Zalamea (1954)
 An Andalusian Gentleman (1954)

References

External links
 

1888 births
1958 deaths
Spanish male film actors
People from Seville